The 2018–19 Welsh Premier League was the 27th and final season of the Welsh Premier League, the highest football league within Wales since its establishment in 1992. The New Saints are the defending champions. The season fixtures were announced on 27 June 2018. The season began on 10 August 2018. Teams play each other twice on a home and away basis, before the league split into two groups at the end of January 2019 – the top six and the bottom six.

The season ended on 26 April 2019.

Teams

The bottom placed team from the previous season, Prestatyn Town, and Bangor City, were relegated to the Cymru Alliance for the 2018–19 season. Despite finishing 2nd the FAW Club Licensing Appeals Body decided to revoke Bangor City's Tier 1 and UEFA licence meaning that they would automatically drop down to the second level of Welsh football. This meant a reprieve for Carmarthen Town who had finished second bottom and would otherwise have been relegated.

Bangor and Prestatyn were replaced by Llanelli Town and Caernarfon Town, champions of the 2017–18 Welsh Football League Division One and 2017–18 Cymru Alliance respectively. Caernarfon Town are playing in the Welsh Premier League for the first time since the 2008–09 season, while Llanelli Town are a new side, replacing the original Llanelli AFC who were relegated at the end of the 2012–13 season and then wound up in the high court. The arrival of Barry Town United the previous season means that both of the former South Wales 'giants' are now back in the Welsh top-flight. In addition, Cardiff Met remain and Carmarthen Town were reprieved, so the balance of power is slowly shifting from what was for a while, an almost predominantly North Wales-based league.

Stadia and locations

Personnel and kits

League table

Results
Teams play each other twice on a home and away basis, before the league split into two groups – the top six and the bottom six.

Matches 1–22

Matches 23–32

Top six

Bottom six

UEFA Europa League play-offs

Teams that finish in positions third to seventh at the end of the regular season will participate in play-offs to determine the third participant for the 2019–20 UEFA Europa League, who will qualify for the preliminary round.

Semi-finals

Final

Season statistics

References

External links

League rules 

Cymru Premier seasons
2018–19 in Welsh football
Wales